The Creative Energy Homes  (CEH) project is a showcase of energy-efficient homes of the future. Seven homes constructed on the University Park Campus of the University of Nottingham are being designed and constructed to various degrees of innovation and flexibility to allow the testing of different aspects of modern methods of construction including layout and form, cladding materials, roof structures, foundations, glazing materials, thermal performance, building services systems, sustainable/renewable energy technologies, lighting systems, acoustics and water supply. The project aims to stimulate sustainable design ideas and promote new ways of providing affordable, environmentally sustainable housing that are innovative in their design. The homes are fully instrumented and occupied in order to provide comprehensive post occupancy evaluation data.

The David Wilson House 
 Construction of the CEH project began in 1999 with the David Wilson Ecohouse.
This is a 4-bedroom detached property which uses brick and block construction. Its main purpose was to support research into domestic-sized renewable energy systems such as micro-CHP (Combined heat and power), solar thermal, micro-wind, sun pipes, and natural ventilation devices.

The house is currently used as office space for University of Nottingham staff and continues to be used as a test bed for University research projects.

The BASF House 
The BASF house was the 3rd house to be constructed and was completed in January 2008 taking only 25 weeks to build. The house was designed by Derek Trowell Architects to demonstrate that it is possible to build an affordable low energy house whilst still adherering to the Passivhaus ideology. It meets the level 4 standard of the Code for Sustainable Homes.

The house has a compact floor area and relies as much as possible on passive solar design to keep costs down. The north, east and west walls are highly insulated, with the minimum number of openings compatible with acceptable day lighting standards. The southern elevation consists of a fully glazed two-layer adjustable sunspace with glazed screens that can be opened or closed to facilitate heating or cooling.

A ground-air heat exchanger, supplied by Rehau, lies to the front of the house and this consists of a network of horizontal pipes buried approximately 2m underground. At this depth the soil temperature only varies between 8-12 °C throughout the year. Therefore, in winter cold air can be pre-heated before being drawn into the house and in the summer the air can be cooled.

A rainwater harvesting system has also been installed, which consists of a 3500 litres tank buried under the car parking space. It collects the run-off water from the roof. This water can be used for washing clothes, watering the garden, flushing the toilet and general cleaning. Water efficiency is also an important factor of the code for sustainable homes and using a rainwater harvesting system drastically reduces the amount of mains water used per person per day.

The sun space, at the front of the house captures the solar gain from the sun, heating the air for use in the rest of the house. The south facing elevation is almost 100% glazed and the north facing elevation 30% glazed, providing improved quality of life in the home by maximising the use of natural daylight and reducing the energy required to light the home.

On the roof of the house are 3 solar thermal panels used for hot water heating. This is a larger system than is typical for this size of house, which allows storage of hot water for as long as 3 days and helps compensate for extended periods of overcast conditions.

The E.ON 2016 House 
The E.ON House is a replica 1930s UK semi-detached house built primarily to research the impact of various retrofitting solutions on the existing housing stock.

According to the Code for Sustainable Homes (CfSH) all the new houses built from 2016 are required to meet Level 6 requirements of the CfSH, or be carbon zero. However, it is estimated that by the year 2050, 25 million existing UK homes will still account for between 70 and 90 percent of the housing stock. Around 25% of UK  emissions derive from the domestic housing stock so clearly there is a large opportunity to reduce UK carbon emissions by increasing the efficiency of existing homes.

The house is built to 1930s building regulations and the project developers had to receive special planning permission in order to construct the house. It has no roof or wall cavity insulation and uses single glazed windows. Hot water is provided by an outdated, inefficient non-condensing gas boiler and immersion heater. The plan is to bring this 1930s house to a top of the range home meeting Level 6 CfSH. It is hoped that the lessons learnt from this detailed research will help point the way to retrofitting homes to create more sustainable properties. The project consists of three phases:

 During the first phase the house was monitored in its original state. There are over 100 sensors positioned around the house monitoring temperature, relative humidity, electricity consumption of individual appliances, gas consumption, water consumption, total electricity consumption and occupancy.
 The second phase was carried out from August 2010 to June 2011. The building was upgraded with additional insulation, an improved heating system, double glazing, more efficient lighting and drought proofing. Research was carried out as to the impact of these improvements.
 In the third phase, due to begin in late 2011, further improvements will be made incorporating the installation of a conservatory-style extension creating a buffer zone between the property and the outside elements and a sun space to maximise solar gain. Renewable energy technologies, such as Solar panel  and solar hot water system will also be installed in order to supply the house with electricity and hot water.

The Tarmac Homes 
Tarmac have sponsored the construction of two semi-detached eco-homes called Tarmac House. These are designed by ZEDfactory, the company responsible for the BEDZED project in south London. One home is built to Level 4 CfSH  and the other to Level 6 CfSH.

These houses demonstrate that it is possible to build a sustainable home using currently available materials and traditional methods of construction. Sustainability features of the properties include:

 Extremely well insulated walls with 250 mm of cavity wall insulation.
 A Biomass heating system situated in front of the houses.
 A Solar water heating system with roof-mounted solar panels.
 Solar century sun slates on the level 6 house helping to meet electricity demands.

The Nottingham H.O.U.S.E (Home Optimising the Use of Solar Energy) 
Nottingham H.O.U.S.E is a small family "starter" home, which was built as a part of a Solar Decathlon Europe 2010 event by the students of the Department of Architecture and Built Environment. The house delivers a zero carbon sustainable design solution that is compliant with level 6 of UK's Code for Sustainable Homes. It is a prefabricated two storey house with a courtyard garden that can be used in terrace or semi-detached form.

The House was presented at the Ecobuild 2010 event and awarded with the prize for the best use of timber. The models of the house were also presented at the Shanghai Expo 2010. The prefabricated house is due to be moved on to the University Park campus of the University of Nottingham in the near future.

The Mark Group House 
The Mark Group house is currently under construction.  It is a 4-bedroom property constructed using a steel framing system with insulation cladding. Construction of the basement uses an Insulating Concrete Form (ICF) which incorporates Ground Granulated Blast Furnace Slag (GGBS) into the Portland cement.

GGBS can be mixed with Portland cement 70%-30% to decrease its carbon footprint by around 40%.

References 

University of Nottingham
Sustainable building in the United Kingdom
Sustainable architecture
Low-energy building
Sustainable design
Environmental social science
Sustainable communities